Dinkytown is a commercial district within the Marcy-Holmes neighborhood in Minneapolis, Minnesota. Centered at 14th Avenue Southeast and 4th Street Southeast, the district contains several city blocks occupied by various small businesses, restaurants, bars, and apartment buildings that house mostly University of Minnesota students. Dinkytown is along the North side of the University of Minnesota Twin Cities East Bank campus.

Notable landmarks 
Notable landmarks include the Dinkydome (a former theological seminary converted to a food court which sometime later was converted into loft space), the Loring Pasta Bar (formerly Gray's Campus Drug and also the building where Bob Dylan lived in Minneapolis), Al's Breakfast (arguably the city's smallest restaurant) and the Varsity Theater.  It's also the location of the second store opened by Richard M. Schulze called "Sound of Music", which later became Best Buy, and is now closed.

Notable establishments 
Several notable establishments include Vescio's Italian restaurant (now closed), which opened in the 1950s, Annie's Parlour, and The Book House. The former Marshall-University High School on the corner of 14th Avenue and 5th street was closed in 1982 due to changing city population demographics, and was purchased and converted into the University Technology Enterprise Center (UTEC) for startups. The building was razed in 2013, and today the location is home to The Marshall, an apartment building for University students. The Chateau co-op built their brutalist-style 22-story apartment in 1973 at 13th Avenue Southeast and 5th Street Southeast. Due to apartment building construction, popular dinkytown establishments like Dinkytown Wine & Spirits and McDonalds recently closed. Target, Five Guys, and the Kollege Klub Bar  are notable establishments today.

History

The name Dinkytown is of uncertain origin, although it was in definite use by 1948, when the Dinkytown Business Association formed.

Stories regarding the origin of the name include
 The streetcars, called Dinkys, that used to provide transit throughout the area.
 Similarly, the locomotive tenders at the nearby railyard were called Dinkys due to their compact size.
 The theatre in Dinkytown had only four rows of seats, and for years was known as "The Dinky Theater." Shortly thereafter, it was just "The Dinky."
 DINKYs ("Double Income, No Kids Yet")
 It's a small (dinky) town-like area; everything is within walking distance.
 The Loring Pasta Bar, previously Gray's Drug on 14th Ave. SE and 4th St. SE has the name of an early owner carved in cement over the doorway: "Grodnik," meaning a small (or dinky) town.  The name of the early owner was Louis Grodnik.  He owned a haberdashery at that location and built the building.  His brother, Hela Grodnik, always claimed that he was the one who named the area when he said that "This is getting to be a real 'Dinky Town."  Grodnik then went on to work for another brother, Jacob Grodnik, at Grodnik Jewelry at 7th and Hennepin in Minneapolis.  Louis also owned a haberdashery at 4th and Hennepin known as "Grodnik and Fassbinder".
 Then-Gopher football player Frank "Dinky" Rog, whose large group of friends spent time in the area during the late 1940s and early 1950s.
 Another conjecture which has been made is that "Grod" means "town" as in Stalingrad and that "nik" is the diminutive form.  Hence small or dinky town.

References

External links
Official Website of the Dinkytown Business Alliance Current resources for the Dinkytown community (formerly the Dinkytown Business Association).
Marcy-Holmes Neighborhood Association Dinkytown is a commercial district, and one of the 5 character areas, of the Marcy-Holmes neighborhood.
Lileks.com -- University of Minnesota pages—contains information and reminiscence about Dinkytown, by Star Tribune columnist James Lileks
The Dinkytown Project
Dinkytown Hub Contains information about Dinkytown including a complete list of all businesses.

Further reading
 Designation Study for Dinkytown Historic District 
 
 

Neighborhoods in Minneapolis
Student quarters
University of Minnesota
Academic enclaves